The 2013 Subway Fresh Fit 500 was a NASCAR Sprint Cup Series stock car race held on March 3, 2013, at Phoenix International Raceway in Avondale, Arizona. Contested over 316 laps on the 1-mile (1.6 km) asphalt tri-oval, it was the second race of the 2013 Sprint Cup Series championship. Carl Edwards of Roush Fenway Racing won the race, his first win in 70 races. Jimmie Johnson finished second while Denny Hamlin, Brad Keselowski and Dale Earnhardt Jr. rounded out the top five.

Report

Background
Phoenix International Raceway is one of five short tracks to hold NASCAR races; the others are Richmond International Raceway, Dover International Speedway, Bristol Motor Speedway, and Martinsville Speedway. The track's first two turns are banked from 10–11 degrees, while the third and fourth turns have an 8–9 degree banking. The front stretch, the location of the finish line, is banked at 3 degrees, and the back stretch has a 10–11 degree banking. The racetrack has seats for  55,000 spectators.

Before the race, Jimmie Johnson was leading the Drivers' Championship with 47 points, and Dale Earnhardt Jr. stood in second with 42 points. Mark Martin and Brad Keselowski followed in third and fourth with 41 points each, and was one ahead of Ryan Newman in fifth. Greg Biffle with 38 was one point ahead of Danica Patrick, as Michael McDowell with 35 points was one ahead of J. J. Yeley and Clint Bowyer. In the Manufacturers' Championship, Chevrolet was leading with nine points, three points ahead of their rival Toyota. Ford was in the third position with four points. Denny Hamlin was the race's defending winner.

The race was the first of the season to remove roof cameras to lessen turbulent air impact, and will be removed for two-thirds of the points races.

Entry list

Practice and qualifying

Three practice sessions were held before the race on March 1 and March 2, 2013. The first session lasted 85 minutes long, while the second was 55 minutes long. The third session lasted for 50 minutes. Martin was just off Kyle Busch's pace, followed by Hamlin, Carl Edwards, and Johnson. The session was paused temporarily after debris prompted a caution.

Forty-three cars were entered for the qualifying session held on March 1. Martin clinched his fifty-sixth pole position of his career, with a time of 26.073 seconds, which was a new race record. He was joined on the front row of the grid by Kasey Kahne. Johnson qualified third, Kyle Busch took fourth, and Gordon started fifth. Tony Stewart, Kevin Harvick, Hamlin, Kenseth, and Newman rounded out the first ten positions.

Post-race

On March 7, NASCAR fined Denny Hamlin $25,000 for saying that the then-new Gen 6 cars did not race as well as the previous-generation car, citing difficulty passing. Because Hamlin publicly refused to pay the fine, NASCAR instead took $25,000 off his race  winnings instead.

Results

Qualifying

Race results

Standings after the race

Drivers' Championship standings

Manufacturers' Championship standings

 Note: Only the first twelve positions are included for the driver standings.

References

Subway Fresh Fit 500
Subway Fresh Fit 500
Subway Fresh Fit 500
NASCAR races at Phoenix Raceway